Balisto is a wholemeal biscuit bar snack manufactured by Mars, Incorporated, consisting of a digestive biscuit centre and a variety of milky cream toppings, and coated in milk chocolate.

Normally, there are two fingers in a package, though the multipack contains ten fingers wrapped individually. They are available in Ireland, Austria, Germany, Switzerland, the Netherlands, France, Luxembourg, Belgium, Slovenia, Hungary, Italy, Denmark. In Spring 2011, the bars were introduced to the United Kingdom.

When the Balisto bar was released in 1981, Mars, Incorporated in West Germany produced it. Its name supposedly alludes to its dietary fibre content ("Ballaststoffe" in German). In 2021 the Balisto bar with 90% paper-based packaging was released for the German market.

Varieties
Balisto is available in several different flavours, each with their own colour. Not all flavours are available everywhere. A partial list:
 Corn/Cereal-mix (orange wrapper): plain digestive biscuit covered with chocolate
 Muesli-mix (green wrapper): milk cream topping with raisins and hazelnuts
 Grain-mix (red wrapper)
 Yoghurt and berries-mix (purple wrapper): yoghurt cream topping with red berries
 Almond and honey-mix (yellow wrapper)
 Cocos-mix (brown wrapper)
 Hazelnut (blue wrapper)
 Spekulatius-Christmas cookie (dark red wrapper)
 Strawberry yoghurt-mix (red wrapper) (available in Germany)
 Yoghurt with white chocolate (white and pink wrapper) (Limited Edition)
 Yoghurt with strawberry and white chocolate (white and red wrapper) (available in Germany)

References

Mars confectionery brands
Brand name snack foods
Biscuits
Chocolate bars